The Order of Sultan Qaboos (Wisam al-Sultan Qaboos) is an order of Oman.

History 
The Order of Sultan Qaboos was instituted in 1985 by Sultan Qaboos.

Ranks 
The order is composed of the following grades :
 First Class 
 Second Class
 Third Class

Insignia 
The ribbon is navy blue with golden borders

Notable recipients 
 Queen Máxima of the Netherlands, First Class.

Sources 
 World Medals Index, Oman
 Ribbon bars of Oman - page 2

References

Sultan Qaboos
Sultan Qaboos, Order of
Awards established in 1985
1985 establishments in Oman